Drivex is an auto racing team and school based in Spain. The team was founded by Pedro de la Rosa and Miguel Ángel de Castro in 2005 as a racing school. The racing team is run by Miguel Ángel de Castro.

History

Single-seaters
Since 2009, Drivex have been contesting the Euroformula Open Championship, with the likes of Celso Míguez, Ferdinand Habsburg and Nikita Troitskiy achieving top three finishes in the drivers' championships.

In November 2018, Drivex announced it would expand into the Formula Renault Eurocup championship for 2019, in collaboration with Fernando Alonso's FA Racing outfit.

Current series results

F4 Spanish Championship

† Azman raced with MP Motorsport from the second round onwards, scoring 141 of his 179 points
‡ Villanueva raced with Fórmula de Campeones - Praga F4 for the final two rounds, scoring 30 of his 90 points

Formula Winter Series

Former Series Results

Formula Renault Eurocup

Euroformula Open Championship

† Shared results with other teams

Timeline

References

External links
 
 

Spanish auto racing teams
Auto racing teams established in 2005
2005 establishments in Spain
Euroformula Open Championship teams
International GT Open teams
Superleague Formula teams
Formula Renault Eurocup teams